Acrocercops argocosma is a moth of the family Gracillariidae, known from Ecuador. It was described by E. Meyrick in 1915.

References

argocosma
Moths of South America
Moths described in 1915